Casey Hansen (born February 2, 1985) is a former American football quarterback. He was signed by the Philadelphia Eagles as an undrafted free agent in 2008. He played college football at Norfolk State as the starting quarterback in 2006 and 2007.

Hansen also played for the Spokane Shock of the Arena Football League.

Early years
Hansen attended Norco High School in Norco, California and was a student and a letterman in football and baseball.

Professional career
Hansen was signed by the Philadelphia Eagles as an undrafted free agent in 2008. He was released prior to training camp. In his rookie season, with the ArenaCup-winning Spokane Shock, he played in 11 games and had a quarterback rating of 141.02. Hansen threw for 447 and thirteen touchdowns for the Shock in 2011.

References

1985 births
Living people
People from Norco, California
Players of American football from California
American football quarterbacks
Norfolk State Spartans football players
Philadelphia Eagles players
Spokane Shock players
Sportspeople from Riverside County, California
Chaffey Panthers football players